The Galena and Southern Wisconsin Railroad Company (G&SWRR) existed as a functioning  narrow gauge railroad from 1874 to 1880, when it was ultimately bought by the Chicago and North Western Railway (C&NW) after a series of short ownership and name changes.  Originally it had connections between Galena, Illinois and Platteville, Wisconsin, with later additions reaching up to Monfort Junction, Wisconsin, near Montfort, Wisconsin, where it ran west to Fennimore, WI, and connected to the Chicago and Tomah Railroad.

Ownership
In the latter years of the railroad, the Galena Gazette wrote many articles about problems between the Bond Holders and Stock Holders causing animosity in Galena, also writing that the entire line would be placed up for auction "on the courthouse steps". There were a number of letters written back and forth between some of the principles involved in this forced sale.

In 1879, the G&SWRR was reorganized by purchasers to the Galena and Wisconsin Railroad Company (G&W).

In August 1880, the G&W was purchased by the Chicago & Tomah Railroad Company (C&T).

In November 1880, there was further consolidation as the C&T was merged with the Milwaukee and Madison Railway (M&M).

In March 1881 there was further consolidation as the M&M was merged with the Chicago, Milwaukee and Northwestern Railway Company(CM&NW).

In June 1883, the CM&NW was merged into (or bought out by - the source is unclear) the C&NW at which time the G&W name appears to have disappeared for good.

The rails between Galena and Benton, Wisconsin were torn out sometime in the late 1930s. The line continued to run between Benton and Platteville until the rails were torn out a few decades later.

Rolling Stock

The Platteville (No. 1)
As for the railroad itself, a Galena Gazette story dated April 9, 1874 indicates that the first of two engines was delivered. It was named the Platteville and numbered as No.1. The description tells that the Platteville had 35,000 W.W.O., 6 drivers (drive wheels) each  in diameter, and one pony truck in front. This makes it a Mogul-type engine, with a  configuration. The tender had a pair of four-wheeled trucks. The Platteville was estimated to be able to pull 800 tons on a level grade, and at 75 feet per mile (1.42%), to draw 100 tons.

The Platteville  gauge locomotive was manufactured in Connellsville, Pennsylvania, at the National Locomotive Works. It cost $7,000 and would be used in the extension and construction of the line to Platteville, Wisconsin, which would eventually be completed on 1 January 1875.  The article also mentions a second locomotive, The Galena, which would be delivered sometime in September 1874.

One interesting story from 6 November 1874 mentions an accident that involved the Platteville locomotive. "Mr. Geo W. Mortimer from the Steam Engine Works at Connellsville, Pa. where the Platteville was made" was slightly injured in a minor steam escape as he was overhauling the boiler.

The Galena (No. 2)
Unlike The Platteville locomotive, The Galena was a  American-type engine. The Galena had  drivers and a similar tender to that of the Platteville but which could hold  of water, (100 less than the Platteville'''s tender) yet still more than enough for the 31 mile trip along the full length of the line, and the locomotive is reported to have had similar traction power to No. 1.

Other Rolling Stock
The rolling stock of the G&SWRR came mostly from the Litchfield Car Works, originally in Litchfield, Illinois.  In 1889 this company moved to Mount Vernon, Illinois and changed its name to the Mount Vernon Car Company. The company had earlier built rolling stock for several railroads, such as the Gulf, California and Santa Fe Railway

The Galena Gazette article of 27 November 1874 mentions a passenger car costing $1,500 being the first such added to the line. By this time the line reached well into Wisconsin, as far up as Cuba City, Wisconsin, and passenger service was vital to the operation of the G&SWRR. There was a report of a minor incident involving the passenger coach, whereby it left the tracks near the tunnel close to Buncombe P.O. and sustained a few scratches, but was quickly returned to service.

A "comfortable caboose" was also added for freight service.  Most of the freight service seems to have been mainly livestock, although Wisconsin cheese and dairy as well as lead and zinc mined in the region would have been an important source of income.  There are also mentions in the Galena Gazette of "hay, flour, and other goods" being transported along the line.  With connections to the Illinois Central in Galena, local goods reached Chicago and beyond. In later years, goods and passengers could ride from Platteville and Ipswich, Wisconsin, (located southeast of Platteville), all the way to Milwaukee, Wisconsin.

Before the G&SWRR ceased to exist independently, General and President Grant and his wife rode the train from Galena to Platteville, as described in a Galena Gazette article.

During the late 1870s, the railroad began losing revenue as flooding and snow storms were regularly stopping all traffic along the line.

Chicago & North Western Buyout
Many of the narrow gauge and smaller railroads in the area were also ultimately bought out by the C&NW as well as other growing major railroad companies at the time.  A museum of local narrow gauge railroads exists in Fennimore, Wisconsin. A Galena Gazette article dated 19 May 1882 tells of the widening of the  Buncombe Tunnel on the border between Illinois and Wisconsin, near Buncombe P.O., to change the entire road to the standard gauge rails used by the C&NW.

The Route Today

In 1878 the narrow gauge mainline stations in Illinois were Galena and Millbrig on the Galena River. Wisconsin stations were Buncombe, Benton, Cuba City, St. Rose, St. Elmo and Platteville. An 1877 extension ran from Phillips′ Corner, east of Platteville, to McCormick′s Corners via Grand View (Belmont).

The old right-of-way, now abandoned, can still be seen in some places, tracing what was once a small but prosperous locally owned and operated railroad empire stretching between Galena, Illinois, and Platteville as well as Montfort, Wisconsin. The fate of the Platteville was reported by the Galena Gazette to have been sent to the C&NW Proviso yards after it sustained damage due to wear and tear, but the Galena'' locomotive's fate is unknown.

The track ran through Millbrig, also called Bell′s Station, by the 1862 stone grist mill that served as post office and depot. William Bell was the miller and postmaster. The mill has been restored and converted into a barn located at Millbrig Hollow on West Council Hill Road. 

There is a short tunnel, still intact, near where the old Buncombe depot once stood. It was built and used by the G&SWRR, also the site of a spur leading uphill northwest to small station near Hazel Green, Wisconsin.

Only a few of the structures that served as stations and depots for the G&SWRR exist today.  Some bridge abutments can still be found where the roadbed snaked along and across the Galena River (Illinois) (also known as the Fevre River). In Cuba City a caboose and a few items from the C&NW days are on display.

The Rountree Branch Trail in Platteville follows some of the right-of-way. There are several concrete bridge abutments near the trail.

References

Galena, Illinois
Predecessors of the Chicago and North Western Transportation Company
Defunct Illinois railroads
Defunct Wisconsin railroads
Railway companies established in 1853
Railway companies disestablished in 1879
Narrow gauge railroads in Illinois
Narrow gauge railroads in Wisconsin
3 ft gauge railways in the United States